Hatem Ali  (2 June 1962 – 29 December 2020) was a Syrian television and cinema director, writer and actor.

Biography
Ali was born in Fiq, Golan Heights, then his family was forced to move to Damascus after Israel occupied that region. He graduated from the Higher Institute of Dramatic Arts in 1986.

He's best known for his work on the TV series Al-Taghreba al-Falastenya, Salah Al-deen, and Omar TV series. Ali gained acceptance in theater arts, and worked as a teacher of Acting in the Higher Institute of Dramatic Arts.

He died on 29 December 2020, at the age of 58, in Cairo, Egypt, after suffering a heart attack. He was buried in the Bab al-Saghir cemetery in Damascus. His final acting appearance before his death was in the Canadian film Peace by Chocolate.

Filmography

Cinema 
Cinematic films directed by Ali include:
 Al-Layl al-Taweel (The long night) (starring the Tunisian actress Anissa Daoud)
 Al Oshak (The Lovers)
 Shaghaf (Passion)

TV series director
Ali has directed numerous TV series, among them are:
 Safar (Traveling)
 Al Fosoul Al Arbaa'a (The Four Seasons) (first and second parts)
 Maraya 98
 Maraya 99
 Aelati Wa Ana (My Family And I) (2000)
 Al Zier Salem (2000)
 Salah Al Din (2001) a series about Salah Al Din
 Sakr Quraish (Quraish Hawk) (2002)
 Rabea Qurtoba (Córdoba Spring) (2003)
 Al-Taghreba al-Falastenya (2003)
 Ahlam Kabiera (Big Dreams) (2004)
 Molouk Al Tawaef (2005)
 Asey Addame''' (Hard To Loosen A Tear) (2005)
 Ala Toul Al Ayam (All The Days) (2006)
 Al Malek Farouk (King Farouk) (2007)
 Seraa Ala El Remal (2008)
 Omar (2012)
 Alam Hemra (2014)
 Al-Arrab - Nadi El-Sharq (The Godfather - Orient's club) (TV series) (2015)
 Al-Arrab - Tahet El-Hezam (The Godfather- Under the Belt) part 2 (TV series) (2016)
 Orkidea (2017)

 As a TV series writer 
Ali wrote scripts for the following series:Al-Camera Al-Khafiya (The Hidden Camera 1995) with Dalaa El-Rahbi
 Muaziek Qous Qazah (Rainbow)
 Al Qelaa (The Castle)

 As an actor 
Series starring Hatem Ali as an actor include:
 Daerat Al Nar (Circle of Fire)
 Hegrat Al Qalb Ila Al Qalb Al Gawareh Al Ragol S (Mr. S)
 Abou Kamel Al Ragol al akhirAl Nissya Qaws kozahNawarHal how alhobAl KhochkhachBent AldoraAssey El DamaaTaht al ardhAl arrab 1 and 2Ma btikhles hikayatnaPeace by Chocolate

Theater director 
The following plays were directed by Hatem Ali:
 Mat Thalath Marrat (Dead Three Times)
 Ahl Al Hawa (People of Instincts)
 Albareha, Alyawm Waghadan (Yesterday, Today And Tomorrow)

Bibliography 
Ali also wrote the following books:
 Mawt Modares Al Tariekh Al Agouz (Death of The Old History Teacher)
 Hadath Wama Lam Yahdouth (What Happened And What Didn't)
 Tholatheyet Al Hesar (Blockade trilogy)

Awards 
 Award for best direction, for the television movie Akher Al Lail (The Last Part of The Night). Cairo TV Festival.
 Award for best direction, for the tv series Safar (Traveling). Cairo TV Festival.
 First work golden award, for the TV series Al Zeir Salem. Bahrain festival.
 Silver award, for the TV series Maraya 98. Cairo TV Festival.
 Bronze award, for the TV series Al Fosoul Al Arbaa'a (The Four Seasons). Bahrain festival
 Golden award for best direction, for the TV series Salah Al Din. Cairo TV Festival.
 Award for best direction, for Salah Al Din. Tunisia festival.
 Award for best direction, for the TV series Sakr Quraish (Quraish Hawk). Cairo TV Festival.
 Award for best direction, for the TV series Al Malek Farouk (The King Farouk). Cairo TV Festival
 Silver work award, for the TV series Ala Toul Al Ayam (All The Days). Tunisia festival.
 Adonia award for the best director for the year 2004, for the series Al Taghreba Al Felasteniya.
 Adonia award for the best director for the year 2005, for the series Molouk Al Tawaef.
 Silver work award, for the series Molouk Al Tawaef. Tunisia festival.

References

External links
 
 
 

1962 births
2020 deaths
Syrian film directors
Syrian television directors
Syrian male television actors
Academic staff of the Higher Institute of Dramatic Arts (Damascus)
Higher Institute of Dramatic Arts (Damascus) alumni
People from Quneitra Governorate